DJ Vibe (real name António "Tó" Pereira) is a house music DJ.

Career
Vibe was born in Lisbon, Portugal, and became a DJ at 15. At this age he started to perform in clubs and before long he was playing side by side with big names of the dance scene like Paul Oakenfold, Tony Humphries, Roger Sanchez and Danny Tenaglia. However, it was his partnership with another Portuguese, Rui da Silva, that propelled him to the top of the house music scene, both nationally and internationally. Together, with Da Silva, he brought life to the project, Underground Sound of Lisbon, which in the summer of 1994 released the hit "So Get Up" (featuring vocals and lyrics by Californian artist/songwriter, Ithaka Darin Pappas) distributed by Rob di Stefano's label, Tribal USA, reaching #1 on the Billboard Club Chart.  He has done an extensive number of remixes for DJ Jiggy, Danny Tenaglia, Kristine W and others.

In addition to DJing, Vibe co-owns Kaos Records, a record store and label in Lisbon, which he founded in 1992 with entrepreneur António Cunha. Vibe has mixed a variety of compilations for Kaos Records, most notably Global Grooves. He was also involved in other projects such as LHT, NYLX, Sonic Hunters and Meco.

Discography
 See Underground Sound of Lisbon for the rest of DJ Vibe's discography

DJ Vibe
1994 "Unreleased Project", with Tó Ricciardi
2003 "Solid Textures", with Pete Tha Zouk
2004 "I'll Take You", with Franklin Fuentes
2007 "Tranzient/Da Muzik", as Calderone & Vibe, with Victor Calderone

Other aliases
1999 "Meco EP", as Meco
2000 "The Driver", as Meco
2005 "Re-Evolution", as Sonic Hunters, with Tó Ricciardi
2006 "Mosquito Pollen/El Ayoun", as Casa Grande

Remixes
Yoko Ono "Everyman… Everywoman…" (2004)

Premiums
1999 reach #1 ranking World's Best DJ's

References

External links

Interviews

Streaming de Sets do DJ Vibe ao vivo na Ant3na
Download free music sets of DJ Vibe

Portuguese house musicians
Club DJs
Living people
Portuguese DJs
Electronic dance music DJs
Year of birth missing (living people)